Mega Man Maverick Hunter X is an action-platforming video game developed and published by Capcom for the PlayStation Portable (PSP); it is a remake of the 1993 video game Mega Man X originally released for the Super NES, the first game in the series of the same name; in the game, players control X as he attempts to stop Sigma from leading the human race to extinction. It was first released in Japan on December 15, 2005, followed by a North American release on January 31, 2006.

Development began with Keiji Inafune discussing with his development team about whether they should make a Mega Man X9 or a remake of the first game for the PSP, with them deciding on a remake due to wanting to take advantage of the new hardware. Due to being on newer hardware, Maverick Hunter X features full 3D graphics instead of the 2D graphics used in the 1993 original, alongside other improvements and extra features.

Upon release, Maverick Hunter X was met with positive reviews from critics, who praised its updated presentation and story, although the music was met with mixed reception; despite this, the game was a commercial failure, leading to Capcom cancelling future remakes of Mega Man. The game was later made available on the PlayStation Vita in February 2012; another Mega Man X game wouldn't be released until Mega Man X DiVE in 2020.

Plot

The plot of Maverick Hunter X follows the original game's story closely, with a few changes. In 21XX, an archaeologist named Dr. Cain discovers X, Dr. Thomas Light's last creation before his death, and uses X's design to create a series of robots called "Reploids"; as the years go on, crimes performed by Reploids start to rise, which leads to the creation of the Maverick Hunters (Irregular Hunters in Japan), a group of Reploids tasked with disabling other Reploids who may pose a threat to humans.

After an encounter with one Maverick named Zero, the leader Sigma unexpectedly turns Maverick himself, leading X and the reformed Zero to stop him from creating a Reploid uprising.

X sets out to defeat 8 of Sigma's followers, receiving armor upgrades from Dr. Light along the way. After defeating all 8 of Sigma's followers, Zero contacts X with information on Sigma's base. X and Zero infiltrate Sigma's base, with both of them eventually encountering Vile, an ex-Maverick Hunter who escaped prison thanks to Sigma. Zero tries to fight him alone, but is defeated. X is quickly subdued by Vile, but Zero sacrifices himself to destroy Vile's Ride Armor. X then defeats Vile, and Zero gives X his buster (if X doesn't have Dr. Light's) to defeat Sigma. X defeats Sigma, destroying his base, and mourns Zero's death.

Playing as Vile provides a slightly different story. Vile is freed from prison by Sigma, yet refuses to join his rebellion, as he refuses to see X's potential. Vile defeats 8 of Sigma's followers to prove himself more worthy than X. Intrigued, Sigma invites Vile to his base to see his power in action, around the same time X and Zero infiltrate the base themselves. Vile is cornered by both X and Zero, but defeats them both and taunts X, preparing to execute him. Zero distracts Vile just long enough for X to fire a charge shot, incapacitating Vile. Sigma approaches Vile, asking what he was planning to do after defeating X. Vile answers that he doesn't know, he just wanted to be superior to X. Vile proceeds to succumb to his wounds, feeling that he validated his existence by defeating X.

Gameplay

Maverick Hunter X is a remake of Mega Man X, originally released in 1993. The original game used 16-bit graphics, however Maverick Hunter X uses realistic 3D graphics instead. Players choose either X or Vile at the start, both of which have their own campaign; X controls similarly to how he did in the original, while Vile has the ability to hover for a short time period. Upon completing the intro level, players can choose one of eight Mavericks to fight. Beating a Maverick will unlock their ability to use as long as X still has weapon energy, using certain abilities on Mavericks will cause them to take more damage than usual. When all eight Mavericks are defeated, Sigma is unlocked as the final boss of the game. Hidden throughout several levels are Dr. Light capsules, which include armor parts that give X additional buffs; in Maverick Hunter X, the position and stages these capsules were in are changed.

After completing the game, a 25-minute anime by Xebec titled The Day of Σ is unlocked; the anime details the events leading up to the first stage, which includes Sigma turning Maverick.

Development

Maverick Hunter X was developed and published by Capcom for the PlayStation Portable handheld video game console; it was produced by Keiji Inafune, who was an artist and writer for the original game, and Tatsuya Kitabayashi. Maverick Hunter X was conceptualized after Inafune discussed with his development team on whether they should make a Mega Man X9 or reboot the series, with them deciding on a reboot due to wanting to take advantage of the new hardware.

The character designs used in Maverick Hunter X were based on the ones used for merchandising and X8, which altered the designs to look more human. The inclusion of Vile as a playable character was done since Inafune felt that having Zero as a playable character felt "too obvious and boring".

Reception

Maverick Hunter X received "generally favorable reviews" according to review aggregator Metacritic, averaging a 79/100; on GameRankings, the game averaged a 82%.

IGN scored the game 8/10 stating "Maverick Hunter X will satiate old-time fans, yet it packs enough new content to draw new players. It's a little on the short side, but it's intense, fun, and very challenging". Phil Theobald of GameSpy was similarly positive, giving 4.5/5 stars saying "It's easily one of the best games available for the PSP, and it might even earn the Blue Bomber a few more fans."

IGN ranked Maverick Hunter X as the nineteenth best PSP game ever made.

Sales
Despite the positive reviews, Maverick Hunter X was a commercial failure, although it sold better in the U.S. Inafune had planned on making remakes of future Mega Man games, but the poor sales of both Maverick Hunter X and Powered Up have put future remakes on hold.

The game would eventually find success following its inclusion on the PlayStation Store; in April 2014, Maverick Hunter X was the tenth-best selling game on the PlayStation Network.

Legacy
In 2011, it was announced by Capcom that both Mega Man Powered Up and Maverick Hunter X would be included in a double pack, alongside a double pack for Monster Hunter Freedom 2 and Monster Hunter Freedom Unite.

In 2018, The Day of Σ was included in the video game compilations Mega Man X Legacy Collection 1 and 2; although the full anime was included and remastered in high-definition, the actual game isn't included, making it and Mega Man X: Command Mission the only two 3D entries not included.

Notes

References

External links
 

2005 video games
Video games about artificial intelligence
Mega Man X games
PlayStation Portable games
PlayStation Portable-only games
Fiction about rebellions
Xebec (studio)
Video games set in the 22nd century
Video games developed in Japan
Superhero video games
Video game remakes